The 2022 African Men's Handball Championship was the 25th edition of the African Men's Handball Championship, held from 11 to 18 July 2022 in Egypt. It acted as the African qualifying tournament for the 2023 World Men's Handball Championship in Poland and Sweden. Originally it was scheduled to be held in Morocco from 13 to 23 January 2022.

Further to the protests received by the day after the draw, the African Handball Confederation took the decision to postpone the competition beyond January 2022. Later the CAHB announced the resumption of the draw and the postponement of the competition first to June 2022 and finally to 11 July. On 29 March 2022, the CAHB decided to replace Morocco as the host due to a potential Algerian boycott after Morocco had proposed holding games in disputed Sahrawi territory.

Egypt won their eighth title by defeating Cape Verde 37–25 in the final. The final match marked the first since 1983 to have a sub-Saharan team, and the first where neither Tunisia or Algeria featured.

Participating teams

1 Bold indicates champion for that year.
2 Italic indicates host country for that year.
3 Algeria originally decided to boycott the competition since it is partly held in the Moroccan occupied parts of Western Sahara. However, after the tournament was moved from Morocco, they reversed their decision.

Draw
The draw was scheduled to take place 8 December 2021 in Abidjan, Ivory Coast. It was cancelled and a new draw was held on 26 May 2022 in Cairo.

Seeding
According to ranking of previous African Championship : 2020 African Men's Handball Championship

Result

Preliminary round
All times are local (UTC+2).

Group A

Group B

Group C

Group D

Placement round
Points gained against the team from the same group were taken over.

Group 1

Group 2

Eleventh place game

Ninth place game

Knockout stage

Bracket

Fifth place bracket

Quarterfinals

5–8th place semifinals

Semifinals

Seventh place game

Fifth place game

Third place game

Final

Final ranking

Awards
The all-star team was announced on 19 July 2022.

References

2022 Men
African Men's Handball Championship
African Men's Handball Championship